Eublemma lozostropha is a species of moth of the family Erebidae first described by Alfred Jefferis Turner in 1902. It is found from Kalbarri in Western Australia north around northern Australia, through central Australia and down the eastern coast to southern New South Wales.

Original description

External links
"Species Eublemma lozostropha Turner, 1902". Australian Faunal Directory. Archived from the original 2 March 2012.

Moths of Australia
Boletobiinae
Moths described in 1902